Acrosanthes is a genus of flowering plants in the family Aizoaceae. It is native to Southern Africa.

Description 
Plants in this genus are  generally prostrate to sprawling branching perennials with opposite succulent leaves. Inflorescences are a cyme, and flowers have 5 calyx lobes, 8 to many stamen, and an inferior ovary. Fruits are 2 loculed capsules with basal placentation (see "in plants"), and the fruit is xerochastic (fruit dehisces when dry). Their seeds are likely dispersed by ants.

Taxonomy 
This genus was first described by Ecklon and Zeyher in 1837.

Species 
There are 7 recognized species as of 2022:

 Acrosanthes anceps (Thunb.) Sond.
 Acrosanthes angustifolia Eckl. & Zeyh.
 Acrosanthes decandra Fenzl
 Acrosanthes humifusa (Thunb.) Sond.
 Acrosanthes microphylla Adamson
 Acrosanthes parviflora J.C.Manning & Goldblatt
 Acrosanthes teretifolia Eckl. & Zeyh.

References 

Aizoaceae
Plants described in 1837
Flora of Southern Africa
Aizoaceae genera